Wayne Tennyson Blackburn (July 10, 1914 in Mount Joy, Ohio – February 16, 2000 in Portsmouth, Ohio) was a major league baseball coach and minor league player-manager.

Blackburn was an infielder nineteen years (1936–1956), all in the minor leagues, losing one year to military service and one year to inactivity. Blackburn drew over 1400 walks in 2016 minor league games. From 1948–56, he had 715 hits and 742 walks in 711 games. He led the 1936 KITTY League with 124 runs, the 1943 American Association with 114 runs, and the 1951 KITTY with 116 runs. He also led the 1948 Southern Association with 36 SB.

Blackburn was briefly a player-manager at the end of the season in 1937 for the Peoria Reds of the Three-I League. Blackburn truly began his managerial career in 1951 with the Owensboro Oilers. He moved to the Detroit Tigers farm system, where he was a player-manager in the minors (1952–54, 1956), minor league manager (1958, 1965–66, 1968) and major league coach (1963–64). From 1968–1969, Wayne coached the Panamanian baseball team in the Caribbean Series while living in Mayaguez, Puerto Rico, with his children and wife.

His Kinston Eagles had the best record in the 1952 Coastal Plain League, as did the Augusta Tigers of the South Atlantic League he took over in mid-1958. His teams also lost in the playoffs in 1953 and 1954.

Blackburn scouted for the Detroit Tigers into at least the mid-1980s.

He married Jeanne Anderson on October 14, 1939. Together, they had six children: Joan Blackburn, Michael Blackburn, Rebecca Blackburn, Kevin Blackburn, Linda Marie Blackburn, and Timothy Blackburn. He served in the United States Army as a TEC 4 in 1945 during the World War II era. He died at age 86 at Hillview Retirement Center in Portsmouth, Ohio and is buried at Greenlawn Cemetery in Portsmouth, Ohio. His legacy lives on through his contribution to Portsmouth, Ohio's baseball history, and he is memorialized on the Portsmouth, Ohio floodwall.

Year-by-year managerial record

References

For a full Bibliography from SABR's The Baseball Index (TBI)

The Professional Baseball Players Database 5.0
All-time Tiger coaches

1914 births
2000 deaths
Baseball player-managers
Minor league baseball managers
Detroit Tigers coaches
Detroit Tigers scouts
Caribbean Series managers
United States Army non-commissioned officers
United States Army personnel of World War II